Shelly Beach is a coastal suburb of Caloundra in the Sunshine Coast Region, Queensland, Australia.

Geography 
The suburb presumably takes its name from the beach known as Shelly Beach along the suburb's coastline.

History
Our Lady of the Rosary Catholic School opened on 29 January 1980 by the Sisters of St Joseph, but is now under lay leadership.

Education 
Our Lady of the Rosary School is a Catholic primary (Prep-6) school for boys and girls at Alfred Street. In 2018, the school had an enrolment of 334 students with 23 teachers (20 full-time equivalent) and 15 non-teaching staff (10 full-time equivalent).

There are no government schools in Shelly Beach. The nearest government primary and secondary schools are Caloundra State School and Caloundra State High School, both in Caloundra CBD to the west.

References

External links
 

Suburbs of the Sunshine Coast Region
Caloundra
Beaches of Queensland